The 1930 Kentucky Wildcats football team was an American football team that represented the University of Kentucky in the Southern Conference (SoCon) during the 1930 college football season. In their fourth season under head coach Harry Gamage, the Wildcats compiled an overall record of 5–3 record with a mark of 4–3 against conference opponents, tied for 11th place in the SoCon, and outscored opponents by a total of 207 to 55. The team played its home games at McLean Stadium in Lexington, Kentucky.

Schedule

References

Kentucky
Kentucky Wildcats football seasons
Kentucky Wildcats football